Réunion Creole, or Reunionese Creole, is a French-based creole language spoken on Réunion. It is derived mainly from French and includes terms from Malagasy, Hindi, Portuguese, Gujarati and Tamil. In recent years, there has been an effort to develop a spelling dictionary and grammar rules. Partly because of the lack of an official orthography but also because schools are taught in French, Réunion Creole is rarely written. Notably, two translations of the French comic Asterix have been published.

Réunion Creole is the main vernacular of the island and is used in most colloquial and familiar settings. It is, however, in a state of diglossia with French as the high language – Réunion Creole is used in informal settings and conversations, while French is the language of writing, education, administration and more formal conversations.

History
Reunionese Creole first formed within the first 50 years of Reunion being inhabited. Most of the people living in Reunion were French, Malagasy or Indo-Portuguese. Most families at this time had at least one native French speaker.

It is now the native language of 90% of the island's population.

See also

Réunionnais literature
Reunionaise Cuisine (in French)

References

Bibliography
 Gunet, Armand (2003). Le Grand Lexique Créole de l'Ile de la Réunion. Azalées Éditions. .
 Marion, Pascal (2009), Dictionnaire étymologique du créole réunionnais, mots d'origine asiatique, Carré de sucre, 

French-based pidgins and creoles
Languages of Réunion
French language in Africa